Richard Tyrwhitt (November 29, 1844 – June 22, 1900) was a Canadian politician.

Born in Simcoe County, Canada West, the son of William Tyrwhitt, he was educated in Barrie and also privately tutored. Tyrwhitt became a farmer in Bradford. In 1870, he married Emma Whitaker.

Tyrwhitt was elected to the House of Commons of Canada for the Ontario electoral district of Simcoe South in an 1882 by-election held after the death of the sitting MP, William Carruthers Little. A Conservative, he was re-elected at the general elections of 1882, 1887, 1891, and 1896. He died while in office in 1900. He was a Lieutenant-Colonel with the 36th Peel Battalion of Infantry, now part of The Lorne Scots. He served during the North-West Rebellion and the Fenian raids.

References

1844 births
1900 deaths
Conservative Party of Canada (1867–1942) MPs
Members of the House of Commons of Canada from Ontario
People of the Fenian raids